Catasetum lemosii is a species of orchid found in northern Brazil.

References

External links

lemosii
Orchids of Brazil